Mackenzie River was a federal electoral district in Northwest Territories, Canada, that was represented in the House of Commons of Canada from 1953 to 1962.

This riding was created in 1952 when Yukon—Mackenzie River riding was split into two. The parts within the Northwest Territories became Mackenzie River riding.

It was abolished in 1962 when it was merged into Northwest Territories riding.

It consisted the Provisional District of Mackenzie bounded on the west by the Yukon Territory; on the south by the parallel of the sixtieth degree of north latitude; on the east by the second meridian in the system of Dominion Land surveys, and on the north by the continental shore of the Arctic Ocean.

Members of Parliament

Election results

See also 

 List of Canadian federal electoral districts
 Past Canadian electoral districts

External links 
Riding history for Mackenzie River (1952–1962) from the Library of Parliament

Former federal electoral districts of Northwest Territories